Willi Jaschek (born 2 September 1940) is a German gymnast. He competed in eight events at the 1968 Summer Olympics.

References

1940 births
Living people
German male artistic gymnasts
Olympic gymnasts of West Germany
Gymnasts at the 1968 Summer Olympics
Sportspeople from Olomouc